A canyon, cañon or gorge is a geographical feature.

Canyon may also refer to:

Places

Canada 
 Canyon, Algoma District, Ontario, Canada
 Canyon, Kenora District, Ontario, Canada

United States 
 Canyon, Alameda County, California
 Canyon, Minnesota
 Canyon, Texas
 Canyon, Washington
 Canyon, West Virginia

Business
 Canyon Bicycles, German bicycle manufacturer
 A brand owned by Cyprus-based ASBIS

People
 Canyon Barry (born 1994), American basketball player
 Christy Canyon (born 1966), retired pornographic actress

Music
 Canyon (band), a slowcore band from Washington, D.C., USA
 Canyon (country music band), an American country music group
 Canyon (Paul Winter album), 1985
 Canyon (Jimmy Ibbotson album), 2007
 The Canyon (album), by the Used, 2017
 CANYON.MID, a sample MIDI file composed by George Stone, produced by Passport Designs and included with older versions of Microsoft Windows

Others
 The Canyon, a 2009 American thriller directed by Richard Harrah
 The Canyons (film), a 2013 thriller neo-noir directed by Paul Schrader
 Canyon (satellite), a 1972 series of United States spy satellites
 Canyons (novel), a 1990 novel by Gary Paulsen
 Canyon (Rauschenberg), a 1959 painting by Robert Rauschenberg
 Canyon (horse), a British racehorse
 GMC Canyon, a Chevrolet Colorado with GMC logos

See also
 Gorge (disambiguation)
 Canon (disambiguation)
 Canyon Lake (disambiguation)
 Canyon City (disambiguation)